Marina Dazmirovna Akobiya (born January 12, 1975, in Volgograd) is a Russian water polo player, who won the bronze medal at the 2000 Summer Olympics.

See also
 Russia women's Olympic water polo team records and statistics
 List of Olympic medalists in water polo (women)
 List of women's Olympic water polo tournament goalkeepers

External links
 

1975 births
Living people
Russian female water polo players
Water polo goalkeepers
Olympic water polo players of Russia
Water polo players at the 2000 Summer Olympics
Olympic bronze medalists for Russia
Olympic medalists in water polo
Medalists at the 2000 Summer Olympics
Sportspeople from Volgograd